Yuri of Galicia may refer to:

 King Yuri I of Galicia (1252–1308)
 Boleslaw-Yuri II of Galicia and Masovia (1308–1340)